Randall MacSorley MacDonnell, 1st Earl of Antrim, PC (Ire) (died 1636), rebelled together with Tyrone and Tyrconnell in the Nine Years' War but having succeeded his brother, Sir James mac Sorley MacDonnell, as Lord of the Route and the Glynns in 1601, he submitted to Mountjoy, the Lord Deputy of Ireland, in 1602. 

In 1618, he became Viscount Dunluce and in 1620 was advanced to Earl of Antrim. However, he remained Catholic.

Birth and origins 

 

Randal was the fourth son of Sorley Boy MacDonnell and his first wife Mary O'Neill. His father was Lord of the Route. His father's family was a branch of the Scottish Clan Donald. His mother was a daughter of Conn O'Neill, 1st Earl of Tyrone. She died in 1582.

Early life 
In his youth, Randal was fostered in the Gaelic manner and lived with a Presbyterian Stewart family on the Scottish island of Arran. He was therefore called "Arranach" in Irish/Scottish Gaelic (meaning "of Arran"). His father died in February 1590 at Dunaneeny Castle near Ballycastle and Randal's elder brother James succeeded as Lord of the Route.

Tyrone's Rebellion 
In 1597, MacDonnell gave offence to the English Crown by helping his brother James to fortify Dunluce Castle. In that same year, he also helped his brother defeat Sir John Chichester in the Battle of Carrickfergus. Chichester, brother of Arthur Chichester, fell in the battle. MacDonnell joined Hugh O'Neill, Earl of Tyrone, in his rebellion, also called the Nine Years' War (1594–1603). Early in 1600, he accompanied Tyrone on his expedition into Munster.

Lord of the Route 
His brother James died suddenly on 13 April 1601 at Dunluce Castle, leaving the eldest son Alistair Carragh (or Alexander), but MacDonnell was designated as successor by tanistry. Foreseeing the failure of the rebellion, MacDonnell started negotiating his submission with the Lord Deputy, Mountjoy, who knighted him on 13 May 1602. In August 1602 he submitted to the lord deputy at Tullyhogue, offering to serve against Tyrone in Fermanagh with five hundred foot and forty horse at his own expense. His example had a good effect in the north.

James I acceded on 24 Mar 1603 and MacDonnell soon received signs of royal favour. On 28 May 1603, he was granted the Route and the Glynns, extending from Larne to Coleraine, nearly 340,000 acres. To this in the following year was added the island of Rathlin.

Marriage 
Before his marriage, MacDonnell fathered three sons, all of whom were probably illegitimate. One, known as Morrisne or Maurice MacDonnell, would be hanged at Coleraine in 1643 for his share in the rebellion of 1641; another, Francis MacDonnell, became a Franciscan monk, and the third was James.

In 1604 MacDonnell married Aellis, Elice, or Alice, who would die in 1665, third daughter of Hugh O'Neill by his fourth wife Catherine Magennis.

 
Randal and Ellis had two sons:
 Randal (1609–1683), succeeded as the 2nd earl and inherited the baronies of Dunluce and Kilconway with the castle of Dunluce
 Alexander (1615–1699), who inherited the barony of Glenarm

—and six daughters, to each of whom he bequeathed £2,800, viz:
 Anne, married first Christopher Nugent, Baron Delvin, and secondly William Fleming, 19th Baron Slane
 Mary, married first to Lucas, second Viscount Dillon, and secondly to Oliver Plunket, sixth Baron Louth
 Sarah, married first Niall Oge O'Neill of Killelagh, in co. Antrim, secondly to Sir Charles O'Conor Sligo, and thirdly to Donal MacCarthy Mor
 Catherine, married to Edward Plunket of Castlecor, County Meath, younger son of Patrick Plunket, 9th Baron Dunsany
 Rose, married to Colonel George Gordon, brother of John Gordon, 14th Earl of Sutherland, who came to Ulster in 1642 as an officer in Major-general Monro's army, and to whose assistance the Marquess of Antrim owed his escape from prison at Carrickfergus in 1643
 Margaret, (died 13 March 1623) never married

In 1606, Dunluce Castle, the priory of Coleraine, three parts of the fishing of the river Bann, the castle of Olderfleet (Larne), and all lands belonging to the Diocese of Down and Connor were for different reasons excepted out of his grant; but on 21 June 1615 Dunluce Castle was restored to him. His fourth part of the fishing of the River Bann, which he regarded as "the best stay of his living," involved him in a long and profitless controversy with James Hamilton, 1st Viscount Claneboye.

Irish troubles 
In 1607, probably on account of his old connection with Tyrone, and because he had about 1604 married Tyrone's daughter Ellis, he was charged by Christopher St Lawrence, 10th Baron Howth with being concerned in the Flight of the Earls, the departure of the earls of Tyrone and Tyrconnell to the continent. He appeared voluntarily before the Lord Deputy of Ireland, Sir Arthur Chichester, denied the truth of the charge, and experienced no further trouble on that account.

The Flight of the Earls in 1607 left him as the most senior Gaelic noble remaining in Ulster. In 1608 when Sir Cahir O'Doherty launched O'Doherty's Rebellion by burning Derry, MacDonnell did not join forces with him. O'Doherty, a former loyalist, had been angered at his treatment by local officials. O'Doherty was defeated and killed at the Battle of Kilmacrennan. In the wake of the rebellion, the government decided to increase the scope of the Plantation of Ulster. This did not affect MacDonnell as the counties Antrim and Down were excluded, as large-scale Scottish settling was already taking place there.

In 1614 another rebellion was attempted. It should have replaced Randal MacDonnell with his nephew Alexander MacDonnell, who had been overpassed in the succession in 1601. Alexander MacDonnell was pardoned. He would be made a baronet in 1627.

Viscount and Earl 
MacDonnell's prudent conduct strengthened his influence at court, and having by his judicious conduct in the matter of the Londoners' plantation at Coleraine, and the zeal with which he strove to civilise his own lands, effaced all memory of his early conduct, he was, on 29 June 1618, created Viscount Dunluce. Shortly afterwards he was admitted a member of the Privy Council of Ireland, appointed Lord Lieutenant of Antrim,
and placed in command of a regiment. On 12 December 1620 he was advanced to Earl of Antrim.

Later life, death, and timeline 
Like his father and the MacDonnells generally, Antrim, as he was now, was a Roman Catholic. In 1621, he was charged, on the information of a certain Alexander Boyd, with harbouring priests in his house. He at once confessed his fault, promised never to fall into the like error again, and was graciously pardoned, but compelled to pay the reward due to Boyd for his information against him.

On seeking confirmation of his estates under the commission of grace in 1629, Antrim was opposed by Cahil O'Hara of Kildrome, who claimed certain lands included in the original grant, and either by course of law or from dictates of prudence O'Hara's claims were allowed.

Antrim sat in the House of Lords in the Irish Parliament of 1634–1635 when it was opened on 14 July 1634 by the new Lord Deputy of Ireland, Thomas Wentworth (the future Lord Strafford), who had taken office in July 1633. On 28 July, however, Antrim was excused from further attendance for reasons of health.

In January 1635, Antrim concluded a bargain with James Campbell, Lord Cantire, afterwards Earl of Irvine, for the purchase of the lordship of Cantire, originally in the possession of the MacDonnells, but they had been expelled in 1607. The arrangement was opposed by the Lord of Lorne, and Antrim's death intervening, the matter sank for a time into abeyance.

Antrim died at Dunluce on 10 December 1636, and was buried in the vault he had built at Bonamargy Friary in 1621. Shortly before his death, he completed the castle at Glenarm.

Notes and references

Notes

Citations

Sources 

 
 
 
 
  – 1625 to 1649
  – Ab-Adam to Basing
 
  – (for timeline)
  – 1534–1691
 
  – 1634 to 1699
 
 
  – Blood royal, dukes, earls (for Antrim)
 
  – Dal-Riada
  – Knights bachelors & Index
 

Attribution:

External links 

Brady/Ohlmeyer, British Interventions in Early Modern Ireland, Cambridge University Press, 2010, 

Antrim
17th-century Irish people
Earls of Antrim
Peers of Ireland created by James I
People from County Antrim
Year of birth unknown